The Liberal government of the United Kingdom of Great Britain and Ireland that began in 1859 and ended in 1866 consisted of two ministries: the second Palmerston ministry and the second Russell ministry.

History

After the fall of the second of Lord Derby's short-lived attempts at governments in 1859, Palmerston returned to power, this time in alliance with his former rival the Earl Russell, in what is regarded as the first Liberal government. Palmerston remained as Prime Minister until his death in 1865, when Russell succeeded him. However, disunity within the party caused the fall of the government in the following year, and Lord Derby formed another Conservative ministry.

Cabinets

The Viscount Palmerston's Cabinet, June 1859 – October 1865
Lord Palmerston – First Lord of the Treasury and Leader of the House of Commons
Lord Campbell – Lord Chancellor
Lord Granville – Lord President of the Council and Leader of the House of Lords
The Duke of Argyll – Lord Privy Seal
Sir George Cornewall Lewis – Secretary of State for the Home Department
Lord John Russell – Secretary of State for Foreign Affairs
The Duke of Newcastle – Secretary of State for the Colonies
Sidney Herbert – Secretary of State for War
Sir Charles Wood – Secretary of State for India
The Duke of Somerset – First Lord of the Admiralty
William Ewart Gladstone – Chancellor of the Exchequer
Edward Cardwell – Chief Secretary for Ireland
Thomas Milner Gibson – President of the Board of Trade and of the Poor Law Board
Sir George Grey – Chancellor of the Duchy of Lancaster
Lord Elgin – Postmaster-General

Changes
July 1859 – Charles Pelham Villiers succeeds Milner-Gibson as President of the Poor Law Board (Milner-Gibson remains at the Board of Trade)
May 1860 – Lord Stanley of Alderley succeeds Lord Elgin as Postmaster-General
June 1861 – Lord Westbury succeeds Lord Campbell as Lord Chancellor
July 1861 – Sir George Cornewall Lewis succeeds Herbert as Secretary for War.  Sir George Grey succeeds Lewis as Home Secretary.  Edward Cardwell succeeds Grey as Chancellor of the Duchy of Lancaster.  Cardwell's successor as Chief Secretary for Ireland is not in the Cabinet.
April 1863 – Lord de Grey becomes Secretary for War following Sir George Lewis's death.
April 1864 – Edward Cardwell succeeds the Duke of Newcastle as Colonial Secretary. Lord Clarendon succeeds Cardwell as Chancellor of the Duchy of Lancaster.
July 1865 – Lord Cranworth succeeds Lord Westbury as Lord Chancellor

The Earl Russell's Cabinet, October 1865 – June 1866

Changes
February 1866: The Lord de Grey succeeds Sir Charles Wood as Secretary for India. Lord Hartington succeeds Grey as Secretary for War.

List of ministers
Cabinet members are listed in bold face.

Notes

References
C. Cook and B. Keith, British Historical Facts 1830–1900

1859-1866
Government
1860s in the United Kingdom
1859 establishments in the United Kingdom
1866 disestablishments in the United Kingdom
Ministries of Queen Victoria
Cabinets established in 1859
Cabinets disestablished in 1866
1850s in the United Kingdom

pl:Drugi rząd lorda Russella